Bicyrtes is a genus of large, often brightly coloured predatory sand wasps. Many species in this genus provision their nests with paralyzed Pentatomidae, while other species make use of Reduviidae and Coreidae instead.

This genus gets its name ("two-humped") from the two noticeable projections arising from the rear of the mesosoma (middle segment).

Selected species 

 Bicyrtes affinis (Cameron, 1897)
 Bicyrtes capnopterus (Handlirsch, 1889)
 Bicyrtes diodontus (Handlirsch, 1889)
 Bicyrtes discisus (Taschenberg, 1870)
 Bicyrtes fodiens (Handlirsch, 1889)
 Bicyrtes insidiatrix (Handlirsch, 1889)
 Bicyrtes quadrifasciatus (Say, 1824)
 Bicyrtes spinosus (Fabricius, 1794)
 Bicyrtes variegatus (Olivier, 1789)
 Bicyrtes viduatus (Handlirsch, 1889)
 Bicyrtes ventralis (Say, 1824)

References

Crabronidae
Apoidea genera
Taxa named by Amédée Louis Michel le Peletier